The Hi-Line is a 1999 drama film by Ron Judkins which is set in the Hi-Line region of the U.S. state of Montana. The film stars Rachael Leigh Cook and Ryan Alosio.

The Hi-Line follows which a man, actor Ryan Alosio, pretending to be a "headhunter" for a Chicago-based retail chain arrives in a small Montana town and contacts a young woman with an offer to interview her for a job. She is still living with what she believes to be her parents. In reality, the "headhunter" has actually been sent by a friend, who is serving a sentence in the Joliet, Illinois prison, to find the young woman and let her know who her real father and mother are. Her father, in Joliet, is about to die while in prison; her mother lives outside of another small Montana town near Havre. When the two split apart, they put the newborn girl up for adoption. She was never told she was adopted, and when she learns the news, she travels to confront her real mother out of anger. The "headhunter" goes with her, and the two develop a romantic relationship on the way.

References

External links 
 

 

1999 films
1999 drama films
2000s English-language films
1990s English-language films